The term sulfate aerosols is used for a suspension of fine solid particles of a sulfate or tiny droplets of a solution of a sulfate or of sulfuric acid (hydrogen sulfate). They are produced by chemical reactions in the atmosphere from gaseous precursors (with the exception of sea salt sulfate and gypsum dust particles). The two main sulfuric acid precursors are sulfur dioxide (SO2) from anthropogenic sources and volcanoes, and dimethyl sulfide (DMS) from biogenic sources, especially marine plankton. These aerosols can cause a cooling effect on earth.

However the UNFCCC has noted that sulfate aerosols remain in the atmosphere for only a short amount of time in comparison to well-mixed greenhouse gases, and therefore their cooling is localized and temporary. Other side effects of sulfate aerosols in the environment include poor air quality.

See also
 CLAW hypothesis
 Cloud condensation nuclei
 Sulfur cycle
 Stratospheric sulfur aerosols

References

Sulfates
Aerosols